Clifford Cox (born October 31, 1954) is a Canadian retired ice hockey center who was an All-American for New Hampshire.

Career
Cox' college career began slowly with him scoring just 16 points in 26 games as a freshman. In his sophomore season, Cox' scoring exploded and he ended with 57 points to lead the Wildcats and help the team finish atop the ECAC Hockey standings. Unfortunately, UNH was stunned in the quarterfinals and lost an overtime game 6–7. After the season, Cox was drafted in both the NHL and WHA drafts. He was selected in the later rounds as professional teams typically didn't believe smaller players could handle the rigors of the professional game. 

During his junior season, Cox suffered a shoulder injury and missed a chunk of the season. He managed to finish with respectable numbers and entered his senior season looking to give New Hampshire its first deep playoff run. The Wildcats finished the season in second place with both Cox and Jamie Hislop tied for the team lead in scoring. Both players were named as All-Americans but neither were able to get UNH a playoff victory. The Wildcats lost in the conference quarterfinals for the fourth consecutive year and Cox' college career was over.

After graduating, Cox joined the Montreal Canadiens's farm system but had a rough year to start. He played just 30 games with the Nova Scotia Voyageurs, scoring 6 points in 1976–77 He appeared in 2 playoff games as the team won the Calder Cup. The following season, Cox was in the IHL (though still a part of Montreal's system) and had a much better year, producing 57 points. He returned to the AHL briefly but otherwise spent the entire season in Flint. The team finished in the middle of the standings and were bounced in the quarterfinals. After the season, Cox retired as a player.

Cliff Cox was inducted into the New Hampshire athletic Hall of Fame in 1983.

Career statistics

Regular season and playoffs

Awards and honors

References

External links

1954 births
Living people
AHCA Division I men's ice hockey All-Americans
Canadian ice hockey centres
Montreal Canadiens draft picks
New England Whalers draft picks
New Hampshire Wildcats men's ice hockey players
Sportspeople from North York
Ice hockey people from Toronto